Each nation brought their under-20 teams to compete in a group and knockout tournament. The top teams and the best second placed team advanced to the knockout stage of the competition. Canada won the tournament after a 4-1 win against the host nation Morocco.

Group stage

Group A

Group B

Group C

Knockout stage

Semi-finals

Third place match

Final

See also
Football at the Jeux de la Francophonie

football
1989
1989
1989 in African football
1989 in Canadian soccer
1989–90 in French football
1989–90 in Moroccan football